Ralph Cox (born February 27, 1957) is an American former professional ice hockey player. He was selected by the Boston Bruins in the 7th round (122nd overall) of the 1977 NHL Entry Draft.

Cox played his high school hockey at Archbishop Williams High School in Braintree, Massachusetts, USA and is one of the best players in program history. Cox then  played NCAA hockey with the New Hampshire Wildcats men's ice hockey team. He was NCAA First-Team All-Conference in 1978–79 and ECAC Hockey Player of the Year in 1979. Cox was the team's leading goal-scorer for three consecutive years and is the only University of New Hampshire player to ever score 40 goals in two different seasons. He was the last player cut from the famed 1980 Mens Olympic Hockey Team that won the gold medal at Lake Placid.

Cox was inducted into the New Hampshire Athletics Hall of Fame in 1986. He then joined the Pittsburgh Penguins (as general managed by Craig Patrick, the assistant coach on the 1980 Miracle team) as a scout, where he received two Stanley Cup rings (in 1991 and 1992), and had his name officially engraved on the Stanley Cup in 1992.

Personal life
Cox is the father of three children: Brian, Delia, and Dylan.

In film
In the 1981 television movie Miracle on Ice, the character of Ralph Cox is played by actor Brian Mozur. A more accurate portrayal of Cox is presented by Canadian actor Kenneth Mitchell in the 2004 Disney film Miracle.

Career statistics

Awards and honors

References

External links

1957 births
AHCA Division I men's ice hockey All-Americans
American men's ice hockey centers
Binghamton Dusters players
Boston Bruins draft picks
Ice hockey players from Massachusetts
EC KAC players
Living people
Muskegon Mohawks players
New Hampshire Wildcats men's ice hockey players
New Haven Nighthawks players
Pittsburgh Penguins scouts
SC Rapperswil-Jona Lakers players
SaiPa players
Sportspeople from Braintree, Massachusetts
Stanley Cup champions
Tulsa Oilers (1964–1984) players
Archbishop Williams High School alumni